Nalin Kohli is an Indian politician and an advocate at the Supreme Court of India. He is a member of and one of the official spokespersons for the Bharatiya Janata Party (BJP). He has also been Convenor of the BJP’s National Media Cell.

Kohli is also a former prime-time news anchor on Doordarshan, the national television channel of India.  His father, Amolak Rattan Kohli, was governor of Mizoram from 2001 to 2006.

References

1971 births
Bharatiya Janata Party politicians from Delhi
Indian television news anchors
Living people